Silvio Moser Racing Team SA was a motor racing team from Switzerland, founded by Silvio Moser. He entered his own cars in Formula One and sports car racing.

Formula One

Silvio Moser first entered a Formula One race at the 1966 German Grand Prix, entering a Brabham BT16 Formula Two car, but he did not start the race. After having raced for Charles Vögele in 1967 and 1968, Moser returned to entering his own team in 1969, again entering a Brabham, this time a BT24 with a Cosworth DFV. At the 1969 Monaco Grand Prix, Moser retired with drive shaft problems from the race on lap fifteen. At the Dutch Grand Prix Moser retired on lap 54 after his ignition failed. At the French Grand Prix, Moser finished in a good seventh position. In Italy he retired on lap 9 because a fuel supply problem. At the Canadian Grand Prix, he retired on lap one after an accident. At the 1969 United States Grand Prix Moser took sixth position, taking the first points with his private team. At the Mexican Grand Prix the last race of the season, Moser on the way to a 6th place, for a fuel leak retired and was classified 11th. For  Moser approached Guglielmo Bellasi to design a Grand Prix car for him. The red car was named "Bellasi" after its designer. The car was not much of a success. The team tried to qualify for five races but Moser only qualified for the Austrian Grand Prix and retired on lap 13 due to a failing radiator.
Martino Finotto bought in autumn 1973 the two Brabham Cosworth BT42-5 and -6, realising quite quickly the power of these cars were above his racing skills. Mr Finotto was the owner of the quite successful Scuderia Finotto. He decided to find more able drivers for the cars to race them. There were selection drives at Monza in late October 1973, among the drivers was Silvio Moser. Apparently Moser was the only one with acceptable times, but he had to finance the venue himself.
Now enters Mr Bretscher. Bretscher wanted to enlarge his company, potentially also abroad. One way was to create the Bretscher Racing Team, which was responsible for the finances, as well as getting the necessary licenses from the FIA. His engagement was classical sponsoring.
Both Brabhams were maintained and entered by the owner, the Scuderia Finotto. On one picture with the transporter with Bologna number plates are the two Brabhams with the four Finotto engineers as well as Jürg Dubler as Team manager, engaged and paid by Bretscher. The livery was according to the colour scheme of the company Bretscher Stores».
Silvio Moser was free to drive races with other cars under the condition they were entered by Bretscher Racing Team. That was the case with the Lola BMW T294, owned by Tonino Nicodemi, as well as potentially F2 entries with a new March. These entries were made through the Silvio Moser Racing Team.

Complete Formula One World Championship results
(key) (Results in bold indicate pole position; results in italics indicate fastest lap.)

References

Formula One entrants
Swiss auto racing teams